This is a list of the chapters of Acacia, in order of chartering.

Undergraduate chapters
Active chapters are indicated in bold. Inactive chapters are indicated in italic. Acacia has both colonies and as associate chapters.

Notes

Graduate chapters 
Acacia has several alumni regional chapters.

References 

chapters
Lists of chapters of United States student societies by society